Maran is a surname. Notable people with the surname include: 

Arnold Maran (1937–2017), Scottish otorhynolaryngologist
Dayanidhi Maran (born 1966), Indian politician
Elthon Maran (born 1989), Indonesian footballer 
George Maran (1926–2011), American opera, oratorio, and concert tenor
Iko Maran (1915–1999), Estonian playwright and children's book author
Josie Maran (born 1978), American model and actress
Kalanithi Maran, Indian media baron
Klaus Maran (born 1959), Italian windsurfer
Meredith Maran (born 1951), American author
Mohammed Maran (born 2001), Saudi footballer
Mukundan Maran (born 1996), Singaporean footballer 
Murasoli Maran, Indian politician
Olav Maran (born 1933), Estonian artist
Rein Maran (born 1931), Estonian cinematographer
René Maran (1887–1960), French poet and novelist
Rolando Maran (born 1963), Italian football manager
Rodolfo Marán (born 1897), Uruguayan footballer
Stephen P. Maran, American astronomer
Timo Maran (born 1975), Estonian biosemiotician and poet

Estonian-language surnames
French-language surnames